José Miguel Álvarez Pozo (26 November 1949 – 31 May 2016) is a former basketball player from Cuba, who won the bronze medal with the men's national team at the 1972 Summer Olympics in Munich, West Germany.

References

1949 births
2016 deaths
Cuban men's basketball players
1970 FIBA World Championship players
1974 FIBA World Championship players
Basketball players at the 1972 Summer Olympics
Olympic bronze medalists for Cuba
Olympic medalists in basketball

Medalists at the 1972 Summer Olympics
Olympic basketball players of Cuba